Kristýna Plíšková was the defending champion, but lost in the second round to Kurumi Nara.

Kateryna Bondarenko won the title, defeating Tímea Babos in the final, 6–4, 6–4.

Seeds

Draw

Finals

Top half

Bottom half

Qualifying

Seeds

Qualifiers

Qualifying draw

First qualifier

Second qualifier

Third qualifier

Fourth qualifier

References
Main Draw
Qualifying Draw

2017 WTA Tour
Singles